Ferhad Ayaz (born Ferhat Ayaz; 10 October 1994) is a Swedish footballer who plays for Bosnian club Borac Banja Luka.

Career
Ayaz, who came to Sweden when he was five years old, started playing football in Karlslunds IF HFK and played as a junior also for IFK Kristinehamn before joining Degerfors IF.

Ayaz started his professional career with Degerfors IF in Superettan, the Swedish second tier, where he made 56 appearances and scored 14 goals across two full seasons.

In 2015, he moved to Gaziantepspor in his country of birth. He made his Turkish Süper Lig debut on 31 January, but failed to impress and returned to his native country and Örebro SK in 2016.

In early 2018, he made another transfer, signing a four year-deal with fellow Allsvenskan club Dalkurd FF.

On 29 January 2022, Ayaz joined Borac Banja Luka in Bosnia and Herzegovina until the end of the season.

References

External links
 
 
 

1994 births
Living people
People from Nusaybin
Swedish footballers
Sweden under-21 international footballers
Sweden youth international footballers
Turkish footballers
Turkish emigrants to Sweden
Degerfors IF players
Örebro SK players
Dalkurd FF players
Gaziantepspor footballers
FK Borac Banja Luka players
Superettan players
Süper Lig players
Allsvenskan players
Premier League of Bosnia and Herzegovina players
Association football wingers
Swedish expatriate footballers
Expatriate footballers in Bosnia and Herzegovina
Swedish expatriate sportspeople in Bosnia and Herzegovina